Judolia cometes is a species of beetle in the family Cerambycidae. It was described by Bates in 1884.

References

cometes
Beetles described in 1884